Yiling District is a district of the prefecture-level city of Yichang, Hubei province, People's Republic of China. Created on July 30, 2001, the district includes most of the former Yichang County, with the exception of Yichang center city (which forms Xiling District) and certain southern and western suburbs.

The land area of Yiling District is 3424 square km, population 510,000 (as of 2004).

The district's seat of government is on the northern outskirts of Yichang urban area.

Both Gezhouba Dam and the Three Gorges Dam are located within the district.

The Xiling Bridge spans the Changjiang (Yangtze River) in the western part of Yiling District, connecting the towns of Letianxi and Sandouping on the northern and southern sides of the river. To add to the confusion, Yiling Bridge is not within Yiling District - rather, it connects the center-city Xiling District with Dianjun District south of the river.

Administrative divisions
The district is divided into 9 towns, 2 townships, and 2 subdistricts:

Subdistricts:
Xiaoxita Subdistrict, Yiling Economic Development Zone Subdistrict

Towns:

Townships:
, Dengcun Township

References

 - Official site of the district government 

County-level divisions of Hubei
Geography of Yichang